Karl Rune Larsson (17 June 1924 – 17 September 2016) was a Swedish sprinter and hurdler who specialized in 400 m events. He competed at the 1948 and 1952 Summer Olympics and won two bronze medals in 1948: in the 400 m hurdles and 4 × 400 m relay. He also won bronze medals in the same events at the European championships of 1946 and 1950. Larsson received the Svenska Dagbladet Gold Medal in 1951.

Competition record

References

1924 births
2016 deaths
Swedish male sprinters
Swedish male hurdlers
Olympic bronze medalists for Sweden
Athletes (track and field) at the 1948 Summer Olympics
Athletes (track and field) at the 1952 Summer Olympics
Olympic athletes of Sweden
European Athletics Championships medalists
Medalists at the 1948 Summer Olympics
Olympic bronze medalists in athletics (track and field)
Athletes from Stockholm
20th-century Swedish people